Chaal Gazab Hai is an Indian short musical drama film directed by Sagar Joshi and produced by Laxman Singh Rajput which was released by Zee Music Company. The musical drama stars Jannat Zubair Rahmani and Shivam Roy Prabhakar in the lead. Theme of the drama was sung by Bollywood singers Pawni Pandey and Prince Yadav.

Cast
 Jannat Zubair Rahmani
 Shivam Roy Prabhakar
 Vinay Aditya Roy

Music 

The music of the film featured the song "Chaal Gazab Hai", which was composed by Vishal Srivastav and sung by Pawni Pandey and Prince Yadav while lyrics are by Harman Preet Singh. The single was sold under the Zee Music Company label.

References

External links
 

2019 films
2019 drama films
2019 short films
Indian short films